Thomas Robert McMillen (June 8, 1916 – September 17, 2002) was a United States district judge of the United States District Court for the Northern District of Illinois.

Education and career

McMillen was born in Decatur, Illinois, on June 8, 1916. He received an Artium Baccalaureus degree from Princeton University in 1938 and a Bachelor of Laws from Harvard Law School in 1941, after which he joined the United States Army, serving until 1945. He entered private practice in Chicago, Illinois in 1946. In 1966, McMillen became a judge of the Circuit Court of Cook County, serving until his appointment to the federal bench. He presided over the bankruptcy of the Chicago, Milwaukee, St. Paul and Pacific Railroad ("Milwaukee Road") from 1977 until its sale to the Soo Line Railroad in 1986.

Federal judicial service

McMillen was nominated by President Richard Nixon on March 29, 1971, to a seat vacated by Judge William Joseph Campbell on the United States District Court for the Northern District of Illinois. He was confirmed on April 21, 1971, and received his commission on April 23, 1971. He assumed senior status on December 31, 1984. McMillen served in that capacity until he retired on September 8, 1985, and returned to private practice. He died in Evanston, Illinois, on September 16, 2002.

References

Sources
 

Hotchkiss School alumni
Princeton University alumni
Harvard Law School alumni
Judges of the Circuit Court of Cook County
Judges of the United States District Court for the Northern District of Illinois
United States district court judges appointed by Richard Nixon
20th-century American judges
1916 births
2002 deaths
United States Army personnel of World War II